Eneojo Joseph Abah  (born 16 February 1990) is a Nigerian  badminton player. Abah hails from Kogi State, North Central Nigeria. He started playing badminton in 2003. He was selected to represent Nigeria in an international tournament in 2005 at the African Junior Championships in Ethiopia. In 2010, he competed at the Commonwealth Games in New Delhi, India.

Achievements

African Games 
Men's doubles

Mixed doubles

African Championships 
Men's singles

Men's doubles

Mixed doubles

BWF International Challenge/Series (5 titles, 5 runners-up) 
Men's singles

Men's doubles

Mixed doubles

  BWF International Challenge tournament
  BWF International Series tournament
  BWF Future Series tournament

References

External links 
 

Living people
1990 births
Sportspeople from Kogi State
Nigerian male badminton players
Badminton players at the 2010 Commonwealth Games
Commonwealth Games competitors for Nigeria
Competitors at the 2007 All-Africa Games
Competitors at the 2011 All-Africa Games
Competitors at the 2015 African Games
Competitors at the 2019 African Games
African Games gold medalists for Nigeria
African Games bronze medalists for Nigeria
African Games medalists in badminton
20th-century Nigerian people
21st-century Nigerian people
abah.pk